In philosophy, episteme is knowledge or understanding. The term epistemology (the branch of philosophy concerning knowledge) is derived from episteme.

History

Plato 

Plato, following Xenophanes, contrasts episteme with doxa: common belief or opinion. The term episteme is also distinguished from techne: a craft or applied practice. In the Protagoras, Plato's Socrates notes that nous and episteme are prerequisite's requisite for prudence (phronesis).

Aristotle 
Aristotle distinguished between five virtues of thought: technê, epistêmê, phronêsis, sophia, and nous, with techne translating as "craft" or "art" and episteme as "knowledge". A full account of epistêmê is given in Posterior Analytics, where Aristotle argues that knowledge of necessary, rather than contingent truths regarding causation is foundational for episteme. To emphasize the necessity, he uses geometry. Notably, Aristotle uses the notion of cause (aitia) in a broader sense than contemporary thought. For example, understanding how geometrical axioms lead to a theorem about properties of triangles counts as understanding the cause of the proven property of the right triangle. As a result, episteme is a virtue of thought that deals with what cannot be otherwise, while techne and phronesis deal with what is contingent.

Contemporary interpretations

Michel Foucault 
For Foucault, an episteme is the guiding unconsciousness of subjectivity within a given epoch – subjective parameters which form an historical a priori. He uses the term épistémè in his The Order of Things, in a specialized sense to mean the historical, non-temporal, a priori knowledge that grounds truth and discourses, thus representing the condition of their possibility within a particular epoch. In the book, Foucault describes épistémè:

In any given culture and at any given moment, there is always only one episteme that defines the conditions of possibility of all knowledge, whether expressed in a theory or silently invested in a practice.

In subsequent writings, he makes it clear that several épistémè may co-exist and interact at the same time, being parts of various power-knowledge systems. Foucault attempts to demonstrate the constitutive limits of discourse, and in particular, the rules enabling their productivity; however, Foucault maintains that, though ideology may infiltrate and form science, it need not do so: it must be demonstrated how ideology actually forms the science in question; contradictions and lack of objectivity is not an indicator of ideology.   Jean Piaget has compared Foucault's use of épistémè with  Thomas Kuhn's notion of a paradigm.

See also

 Zeitgeist

Notes

References
 .
 .

Concepts in ancient Greek epistemology
Discourse analysis
Knowledge
Michel Foucault
Philosophy of science
Theories in ancient Greek philosophy